The Seattle Pacific Falcons (also SPU Falcons) are the 12 varsity athletic teams that represent Seattle Pacific University, located in Seattle, Washington, in NCAA Division II intercollegiate sports. The Falcons compete as members of the Great Northwest Athletic Conference for all sports except for gymnastics, which competes in the Mountain Pacific Sports Federation.

Teams

Men's
 Basketball
 Cross-Country
 Soccer
 Track & Field

Women's
 Basketball
 Cross-Country
 Rowing
 Soccer
 Track & Field
 Volleyball

History

National championships

References

External links